KVOT (1340 AM) is a radio station broadcasting a Christian Contemporary radio format. The station, located in Taos, New Mexico, is owned by L.M.N.O.C. Broadcasting LLC.

FM Translator
In addition to the main AM frequency, KVOT also broadcasts on an FM translator in order to provide improved coverage.  It also provides the listener the ability to listen on the FM band with its improved fidelity.

References

External links

Mass media in Taos, New Mexico
VOT
Radio stations established in 2006
2006 establishments in New Mexico